The Traful River is a river in Argentina. It flows from Traful Lake to Limay River.

See also
List of rivers of Argentina

References
 Rand McNally, The New International Atlas, 1993.
  GEOnet Names Server

Rivers of Argentina
Rivers of Neuquén Province